Alone in Berlin is a 2016 war drama film which was directed by Vincent Pérez and written by Pérez and Achim von Borries. It is based on the 1947 fictionalised true story Every Man Dies Alone, by Hans Fallada. The novel's characters Otto and Anna Quangel are based on Otto and Elise Hampel. When their son dies in France, the couple start writing postcards to urge people to protest against Adolf Hitler and the Nazi regime. The film stars Emma Thompson, Brendan Gleeson, Daniel Brühl, and Mikael Persbrandt. Principal photography began on 27 March 2015 in Berlin. It was selected to compete for the Golden Bear at the 66th Berlin International Film Festival.

Plot 
In 1940, a working-class couple in World War II-era Berlin, Otto and Anna Quangel, decide to resist Adolf Hitler and the Nazis after receiving news of the death of their only son. Their growing resistance to the regime is also strengthened by the fate of an old Jewish woman living in their building. Although the official deportation of Jews to death camps had not yet started, Jews have no recourse to any legal protection. Ruthless Nazis — and "non-ideological" common criminals — use the opportunity to loot the old woman's apartment with impunity. Despite the efforts of the Quangels and other kind neighbors to help her, the persecution ends with the old woman jumping to her death from a high window.

The couple starts writing postcards to urge people to stand against Hitler and the Nazis and protest against them by furtively placing the cards in public places - a capital crime. Their first card reads: "Mother, Hitler Killed My Son. He Will Kill Your Son Too". At first, Otto wants to do it all by himself, warning Anna, "They hang women, too!" Other cards read "Stop the War machine; Hitler's shadow falls over Europe like the devil's shadow; Pass this card on -- Down with the Hitler Regime" (Minute ~40:00 of the movie). She, however, insists on taking part in this dangerous activity. While in the beginning of the film the couple's marriage seems to have dried up and they are unable to console each other for the loss of their son, their shared risk and commitment brings them closer. In effect, they fall in love with each other again.

Gestapo inspector Escherich is charged with finding the source of the postcards. He is a professional police detective acting out of career pride rather than Nazi ideology. During three years of painstakingly gathering clues about the "Hobgoblin" (as he calls the mysterious writer of the postcards), Escherich develops an increasing respect for this elusive unknown opponent.  Because of his lack of progress, Escherich is beaten up by the obviously impatient SS senior officer and forced to summarily execute a man whom he is certain has no connection with these subversive postcards.

After some postcards accidentally fall from Otto's pocket at work, he is exposed and arrested. He remains stoic about the certain death sentence awaiting him and tries in vain to take all the blame on himself and save Anna.  After the couple have been executed, Escherich is alone in his office. He gathers up the couple's hundreds of postcards, scatters them from the open window of the police headquarters, and then shoots himself. The film ends with the image of the postcards swirling in the wind, falling down on the Berlin streets and being picked up by passersby.

Cast 
 Emma Thompson as Anna Quangel
 Brendan Gleeson as Otto Quangel
 Daniel Brühl as Inspector Escherich
 Mikael Persbrandt as Standartenführer Prall
 Monique Chaumette as Frau Rosenthal
 Joachim Bissmeier as Herr Fromm
 Lars Rudolph as Enno Kluge
 Louis Hofmann as Hans Quangel
 Godehard Giese as Colonel Krüger
 Jacob Matschenz as Dietrich Necker
 Katharina Schüttler as Claire Gehrich

Production 
Hans Fallada's Every Man Dies Alone was published posthumously in German in 1947 and was praised by Primo Levi, writer and survivor of Auschwitz, as "the greatest book ever written about German resistance to the Nazis". It was previously adapted as Alfred Vohrer's Everyone Dies Alone in 1975, along with 
West and East German made-for-television dramas in 1962 and 1970.

Marco Pacchioni and Vincent Pérez bought the rights to the novel in 2007. Upon publication of its English translation in 2009, it became a "surprise bestseller" in both the United States and United Kingdom.

On 14 May 2014, it was announced that Pérez would direct the film based on an adaptation he cowrote with Achim von Borries. Emma Thompson, Mark Rylance, and Daniel Brühl were named for the principal roles. It was produced by X-Filme's Stefan Arndt and Uwe Schott (German rights), Master Movies' Marco Pacchioni (French rights) and Filmwave's Christian Grass and Paul Trijbits, and James Schamus. On 26 March 2015, Rylance was replaced by Brendan Gleeson.

Other crew members included cinematographer Christophe Beaucarne, production designer Jean-Vincent Puzos, and editor François Gédigier. Alison Thompson handled most foreign sales for the film through her Sunray Films, although Pathé released it in French-speaking areas.

The director dedicated the film "in memory of Otto and Elise Hampel guillotined for having written and circulated cards against the Nazi regime between 1940 and 1943."

Filming 
Principal photography on the film began on 27 March 2015 in Berlin. It was also shot in Cologne and Görlitz.

Reception
Alone in Berlin was first screened at the Berlin Film Festival in February 2016. Tara Brady of The Irish Times wrote: 
"Despite a terrific triumvirate of performances from Gleeson, Thompson, and Brühl, and soft lensing from cinematographer Christophe Beaucarne, Alone in Berlin is hampered by stodgy pacing, budgetary constraints, and drab interiors. Against this, the film offers a fascinating and timely blueprint for political dissent, a methodology that connects with pamphleteering, graffiti, and memes."In The Guardian, Peter Bradshaw wrote, "More than once, 'Alone in Berlin' reminded me of Fritz Lang's M." The film received a score of 52 on the critical aggregator website Metacritic, indicating "mixed or average reviews".

See also 
 Everyone Dies Alone (1962 West German film)
  (1970 East German miniseries)

References

External links 
 
 

2016 films
Films based on German novels
Films based on non-fiction books
German war drama films
World War II films based on actual events
Films about Nazi Germany
Drama films based on actual events
Films set in 1940
British remakes of German films
French war drama films
British war drama films
Films directed by Vincent Pérez
Films produced by James Schamus
Films scored by Alexandre Desplat
Pathé films
Films about the German Resistance
English-language French films
English-language German films
British World War II films
German World War II films
French World War II films
2010s English-language films
2010s British films
2010s French films
2010s German films
Adaptations of works by Hans Fallada